Mine Own Executioner is a 1960 Australian television play based on Nigel Balchin's 1945 novel of the same name. It was shot in Melbourne, at a time when Australian drama was rare.

Plot
Psychiatrist Felix Milne (Brian James) is treating a schizophrenic ex-war pilot Adam Lucian (Edward Brayshaw). Felix and his wife Pat (June Brunell) are incompatible, but he is attracted to Barbara (Beverley Phillips), wife of Peter Edge, who are friends of the Milnes. After Adam makes two attempts to kill his wife, she begs Felix to treat her husband.

Cast
Brian James as Felix Milne
June Brunell as Pat Milne
Edward Brayshaw as Adam Lucian
Beverley Phillips as Barbara
Roland Renshaw as Peter Edge
Marcella Burgoyne as Molly Lucian
Wynne Roberts
Kurt Ludescher
Edward Howell
Campbell Copelin
Kendrick Hudson
James Lynch
Lloyd Cunnington

Reception
The Australian Woman's Weekly called it "the best live TV drama yet." The Age, however, said the production was a "waste of time" and that the script was "dated".

References

External links
Mine Own Executioner at IMDb

Australian television films
Films directed by William Sterling (director)